= Sevaiattam =

Traditional dance in Tamil Nadu, India

Sevaiattam or Servaiattam is a traditional dance performed by villagers in Tamil Nadu, in the southern part of India.
